Ernst Olof Wilhelm Brunman (2 August 1886 – 1 January 1961) was a Swedish stage and film actor.

Selected filmography

 Johan Ulfstjerna (1923)
 Artificial Svensson (1929)
 Ulla, My Ulla (1930)
 Frida's Songs (1930)
 Cavaliers of the Crown (1930)
 Skipper's Love (1931)
 The Red Day (1931)
 Love and the Home Guard (1931)
 Colourful Pages (1931)
 Simon of Backabo (1934)
 The Marriage Game (1935)
 Kanske en gentleman (1935)
 The People of Småland (1935)
 Under False Flag (1935)
 Johan Ulfstjerna (1936)
 Life Begins Today (1939)
 They Staked Their Lives (1940)
 A Real Man (1940)
 Heroes in Yellow and Blue (1940)
 Blossom Time (1940)
 The Fight Continues (1941)
 Lasse-Maja (1941)
 Scanian Guerilla (1941)
 There's a Fire Burning (1943)
 In Darkest Smaland (1943)
 A Girl for Me (1943)
 The Rose of Tistelön (1945)
 Affairs of a Model (1946)
 The Balloon (1946)
 Don't Give Up (1947)
 Crime in the Sun (1947)
 Lilla Märta kommer tillbaka (1948)
 Private Bom (1948)
 Only a Mother (1949)
 Realm of Man (1949)
 Father Bom (1949)
 To Joy (1950)
 The Quartet That Split Up (1950)
 Summer Interlude (1951)
 Defiance (1952)
 Summer with Monika (1953)
 Enchanted Walk (1954)
 Wild Birds (1955)
 The Song of the Scarlet Flower (1956)

References

Bibliography
 Steene, Birgitta. Ingmar Bergman: A Reference Guide. Amsterdam University Press, 2005.

External links

1886 births
1961 deaths
Swedish male film actors
Swedish male silent film actors
Swedish male stage actors
20th-century Swedish male actors
Male actors from Stockholm